Robert James Neate (31 January 1925 – 20 February 2010) was an  Australian rules footballer who played with Hawthorn in the Victorian Football League (VFL).

Neate served in the Australian Army during World War II.

Notes

External links 

1925 births
2010 deaths
Australian rules footballers from Victoria (Australia)
Hawthorn Football Club players
People from Hawthorn, Victoria